The Johnson-Hach House is a historic house in Clarksville, Tennessee, U.S.. It was built circa 1877 for Polk Grundy Johnson, the son of Congressman Cave Johnson. It was purchased in 1917 by Adolph Hach, a German-born businessman who invested in tobacco production. The house remained in the Hach family until 1992.

The house was designed in the Italianate architectural style, with Colonial Revival features. It has been listed on the National Register of Historic Places since December 10, 1998.

References

National Register of Historic Places in Montgomery County, Tennessee
Italianate architecture in Tennessee
Colonial Revival architecture in Tennessee
Houses completed in 1877
1877 establishments in Tennessee